Pasham Yadagiri is a journalist, activist and Convenor of the Telangana Aikya Karyacharana Samiti. He fought in the 1969 Telangana agitation. He is also considered as one of the most senior journalist and advisor to journalist schools. He has also worked with many newspapers namely 'Udayam'. He is a political analyst and philosopher.

Life
He was born in Hyderabad State and went to a Urdu medium school.

He played a prominent role in Telangana movement. Before the political parties took the idea of bifurcation as their policy, Pasham Yadagiri along with others were demanding for a separate state in 1990's itself.

He is also a founder member of Hyderabad Zindabad. He has been organizing, attending public meetings to activate the real form of development. His ideas and thinking on Telangana and other political beliefs has marked the generations to rethink and revise the thoughts.

He is an expert in toponymy of Hyderabad locations. Telangana political leaders and journalists have taken his valuable suggestions and advice now and then for better functioning of their tasks and actions. Yadagiri has invoked and developed various political and scientific thoughts for progress in society.

His knowledge in various issues is vast, practical and forthright. He has remarkable foresight on varied issues relating to rural development, agrarian crisis, economy, politics and current affairs.

References

Activists from Telangana
Living people
Year of birth missing (living people)